Stadio Bruno Benelli is a multi-use stadium in Ravenna, Italy.  It is currently used mostly for football matches and is the home ground of Ravenna Calcio.  The stadium holds 12,020 and was opened in 1966.

External links
Stadium picture

Ravenna F.C.
Bruno Benelli
Buildings and structures in Ravenna
Sports venues in Emilia-Romagna